Muta Mestri or Mutamestri ( or ) is a 1993 Indian Telugu-language action drama film directed by A. Kodandarami Reddy. The film stars Chiranjeevi, Meena, Roja and Sharat Saxena in prominent roles. The music was composed by Raj–Koti.

Released on 17 January 1993, the film was successful at the box office. Chiranjeevi won the Filmfare Award for Best Actor – Telugu for the film. It was dubbed and released in Tamil as Manbhumigu Maistri.

Plot 

Bose (Chiranjeevi) is a very patriotic man who fights for the rights of the local market workers against Aatma (Sharat Saxena), the nearby underworld don. Seeing his dedication for helping the working poor, the Chief Minister (Gummadi) asks him to enter politics. As a politician, he takes charge of a special branch of commandos and destroys Aatma's illegal operations. In retaliation, Aatma has Bose's sister falsely implicated in a prostitution case, after which she commits suicide on the court steps. Bose resigns from his position and takes revenge on Aatma. Finally, he returns to his old life at the market.

Cast 

 Chiranjeevi as Subhash Chandra Bose aka Bose
 Meena as Bujjamma
 Roja as Kalpana
 Mansoor Ali Khan as Inspector
 Brahmanandam as Coolie
 Sharat Saxena as Athma Ram
 Gummadi as Chief Minister
 Kota Srinivasa Rao
 J. V. Somayajulu
 Allu Rama Lingaiah
 Srihari
 Yuvarani
 Narsing Yadav
 Silk Smitha special appearance in "Ee Petaku"
 Raghava Lawrence as a dancer in "Ee Petaku"

Soundtrack 
Music was composed by Raj–Koti. Veturi wrote five songs while Bhuvana Chandra wrote one. Music was released by Lahari Music.

In popular culture 
Chiranjeevi dressing up as Batman and dancing became a popular internet meme.

Awards 
Chiranjeevi won the Filmfare Award for Best Actor – Telugu, and the Cinema Express Award for Best Telugu Actor for his performance.

References

External links 
 

1990s Telugu-language films
1993 films
Films directed by A. Kodandarami Reddy
Films scored by Raj–Koti